Bungay High School is a mixed-sex secondary school with academy status in the town of Bungay in the north of the English county of Suffolk. It caters for children aged 11 to 18. The school was founded as Bungay Grammar School in 1565 and became Bungay High School in 1974. It occupies a site on the Queen's Road site to the south of the town centre.

The school operates a sixth form on the site of the high school. This caters for post-16 students, including offering a range of vocational and academic qualification. This closed in August 2017 due to the lack of funding.

In 2021, the school was awarded an Ofsted inspection rating of "good".

Notable alumni

Bungay Grammar School
 John Charles Winter (1923-2012), Organist and Master of the Choristers of Truro Cathedral, 1971-1988
 Leslie Boreham (1918-2004),  barrister and judge, he presided over two high-profile court cases, of the Yorkshire Ripper Peter Sutcliffe (1981) and Brighton bomber Patrick Magee (1986).
 Alfred Page (1912-1988), clergyman and Archdeacon of Leeds from 1969 to 1981
 Daisy Cooper, MP for St Albans

References

External links
Bungay High School

Academies in Suffolk
Secondary schools in Suffolk
1565 establishments in England
Educational institutions established in the 1560s
Bungay